The 2023 LIV Golf League is the second season of LIV Golf following the inaugural LIV Golf Invitational Series. The season consists of fourteen 54-hole tournaments, featuring 48 players and no cut, and a team championship event at the season end. Twelve teams and forty-eight individuals are competing for a total of $405 million in prize purses.

Broadcasting
In the United States, The CW will broadcast and stream the tournaments under a multi-year deal with the organization signed in January 2023.

Teams
The 2023 LIV Golf League will consist of twelve teams. Unlike the structure of the 2022 Invitational Series, where some players regularly changed teams from week-to-week, the 2023 season is planned to have players signed to individual teams and will remain with that team throughout the entire season. LIV Golf began announcing team rosters on 15 February 2023.

Schedule
The following table lists official events during the 2023 season.

Notes

References

External links

2023
2023 in golf
Current golf seasons